Fairfield Public Library is located in Fairfield, Iowa, United States.  A library association was founded by a group of local men in 1853, and funded by dues from its members.  It was housed in several different buildings for the first 40 years.  U.S. Senator James F. Wilson from Fairfield was instrumental in obtaining a grant from Andrew Carnegie for a building of its own.  The grant for $40,000 was accepted on January 15, 1892.  It was the first Carnegie Library outside of Western Pennsylvania and the first of 101 built in Iowa.  It was also one the few libraries Carnegie funded without stipulations concerning its use, public support, or design.  The building was designed in the Richardsonian Romanesque style by Kansas City architect C. Stafford.  It was officially opened on Friday, September 29, 1893, and it was dedicated on November 28 of the same year.  The association continued to run the library until 1899 when voters approved a referendum to support it with taxes.  The building has been altered in the ensuing years, and it was listed on the National Register of Historic Places in 1983.  The library moved to a new building in 1996, and the historic building is now home to the Jefferson County Service Center of Indian Hills Community College.

References

Library buildings completed in 1893
Fairfield, Iowa
Carnegie libraries in Iowa
Libraries on the National Register of Historic Places in Iowa
Richardsonian Romanesque architecture in Iowa
Buildings and structures in Jefferson County, Iowa
National Register of Historic Places in Jefferson County, Iowa